José Miguel Bonetti Guerra GCSG (born 25 February 1938, in Santo Domingo) is a businessman from the Dominican Republic. He was the chairman of Grupo Sociedad Industrial Dominicana (Grupo SID) for more than 45 years until 2015, when he was succeeded by his daughter Ligia Bonetti. According to Forbes, Bonetti's is among the ten largest fortunes in the Dominican Republic, with a net worth near one billion dollars as of 2014. He is also part of the President's Leadership Council for the Inter-American Dialogue.

Bonetti Guerra was born to the politician José María Bonetti Burgos and his wife, Ligia Guerra.

References

External links 
 Website Grupo SID

Living people
1938 births
People from Santo Domingo
Dominican Republic people of Canarian descent
Dominican Republic people of French descent
Dominican Republic people of Italian descent
Dominican Republic people of Spanish descent
Wharton School of the University of Pennsylvania alumni
Universidad Autónoma de Santo Domingo alumni
Dominican Republic chairpersons of corporations
Order of Merit of Duarte, Sánchez and Mella
Knights of St. Gregory the Great
Dominican Republic billionaires
People of Ligurian descent